Diary of a Wimpy Kid is an American children's book series and media franchise created by author and cartoonist Jeff Kinney. The series follows Greg Heffley, a middle-schooler who illustrates his daily life in a diary (although he constantly tells the audience that it is a journal).

Kinney spent eight years working on the book before showing it to a publisher. In 2004, FunBrain and Kinney released an online version of Diary of a Wimpy Kid. The website made daily entries from September 2004 to June 2005. The online version had received almost 20 million views by 2009. Nonetheless, many online readers requested a printed version. In February 2006, during the New York Comic Con, Kinney signed a multi-book deal with publisher Abrams Books to turn Diary of a Wimpy Kid into a printed book series. The first installment was released in April 2007 and received immediate success. In April 2009, Time magazine named Kinney in the Time 100 most influential people.

Seventeen books in the series have been released as of 2022, an activity book has also been released. A spin-off series, centering on the character Rowley Jefferson, has three installments as of 2021. 20th Century Studios produced a live-action film series of the same title from 2010 - 2017, and two series of animated films in the early 2020s.

Since the release of the online version, most of the books have garnered positive reviews and commercial success. As of 2022, more than 275 million copies have been sold globally, making it the fourth best-selling book series of all time.

Chronology

Supplementary books
Diary of a Wimpy Kid Do-It-Yourself Book is an activity book that features a blank section encouraging readers to keep their own journal in the style of the books.
The Wimpy Kid Do-It-Yourself Book (published after the second edition of Wimpy Kid Movie Diary  and before Cabin Fever) is the same book as the first Do-It-Yourself Book, but with 60 extra pages and 16 more full-color comics.
The Wimpy Kid Movie Diary is a book about the making of the first film, which features stills and brand-new illustrations. Jeff Kinney dedicated the book to the film's main stars, Zachary Gordon and Robert Capron.
The Wimpy Kid Movie Diary: Now Includes The New Movie Rodrick Rules is an updated version of the first book, now featuring stills from the second film Rodrick Rules, more new illustrations, and information on how the second film was made.
The Wimpy Kid Movie Diary: The Story of All 3 Movies! is the second updated version of the first book, now adding stills from the third film Dog Days, and information on how this film was made.
The Wimpy Kid Movie Diary: The Next Chapter covers how the film The Long Haul was made. It is dedicated to Jason Drucker, the actor who played Greg in that movie.

Spin-offs
A spin-off series has been published, written from Rowley's perspective. The first installment, Diary of an Awesome Friendly Kid: Rowley Jefferson's Journal, was released on April 9, 2019, and is a series of anecdotes about Greg and Rowley's friendship. The second, Rowley Jefferson's Awesome Friendly Adventure, is in the style of a fantasy adventure and was released on August 4, 2020. The book's original release date was April 7, 2020, but was delayed due to the COVID-19 pandemic. The third, Rowley Jefferson's Awesome Friendly Spooky Stories, was released on March 16, 2021.

Audiobooks
Audiobooks have been released for each main installment in the Diary of a Wimpy Kid series. The Recorded Books versions are read by Ramon de Ocampo, while the Penguin Books versions are read by Dan Russell, who has done so since The Third Wheel, and in 2018 he re-narrated the first 6 books for the markets where Penguin publish the series.

 Diary of a Wimpy Kid (April 1, 2007)
 Diary of a Wimpy Kid: Rodrick Rules (February 1, 2008)
 Diary of a Wimpy Kid: The Last Straw (January 13, 2009)
 Diary of a Wimpy Kid: Dog Days (October 12, 2009)
 Diary of a Wimpy Kid: The Ugly Truth (November 9, 2010)
 Diary of a Wimpy Kid: Cabin Fever (November 15, 2011)
 Diary of a Wimpy Kid: The Third Wheel (November 13, 2012)
 Diary of a Wimpy Kid: Hard Luck (November 5, 2013)
 Diary of a Wimpy Kid: The Long Haul (November 4, 2014)
 Diary of a Wimpy Kid: Old School (November 3, 2015)
 Diary of a Wimpy Kid: Double Down (November 1, 2016)
 Diary of a Wimpy Kid: The Getaway (November 7, 2017)
 Diary of a Wimpy Kid: The Meltdown (October 30, 2018)
 Diary of a Wimpy Kid: Wrecking Ball (November 5, 2019)
 Diary of a Wimpy Kid: The Deep End (October 27, 2020)
 Diary of a Wimpy Kid: Big Shot (October 26, 2021)
 Diary of a Wimpy Kid: Diper Överlöde (October 25, 2022)

Characters

Greg Heffley is a middle school student, who is the main character and narrator of the series. He is an anti-hero, described by Kinney as "cocksure" and "misguided".
Rowley Jefferson is Greg's good-natured best friend.
Rodrick Heffley is Greg and Manny's older brother, who is rude, and the drummer in his band Löded Diper. He usually is noted for playing tricks on Greg.
Manny Heffley is Greg and Rodrick's spoiled younger brother, who is known to be a tattletale.
Susan Heffley is Greg's mother. She often embarrasses Greg.
Frank Heffley is Greg's father. He always wants Greg to do sports and "to become a man", and doesn't like giving up.
Gramma is Greg's maternal grandmother.
Grandpa is Greg's paternal grandfather who is sometimes noted for irritating Greg.
Fregley is Greg's odd neighbor and classmate.
Chirag Gupta is one of Greg's friends whom he once played a trick on, pretending Chirag to have been invisible, then later pretended he was going deaf.
Holly Hills is Greg's crush.
Heather Hills is Holly's sister, and was Greg and Rodrick's crush.
Sweetie is the name given to the Heffleys' temporary dog, who annoys Greg. Later on, they give him to Gramma, who spoils him and is the cause of him becoming overweight.
An unnamed pig was won by Manny at a county fair. The pig displays high intelligence, and walks upright. In 'The Getaway', the family put the pig in a kennel while they went on Holiday but the pig escaped and hasn't been seen since.

Achievements

Awards and honors

Commercial success
Diary of a Wimpy Kid was well received from The Princeton Review, Gold Card Association, The Dallas News, The TRR Editors, The NW Press, and The JJ Printing Company. The New York Times, which ranks children's serials collectively on a "Series Books" bestseller list, has included the Wimpy Kid series for 664 weeks as of December 8, 2021. USA Today, which ranks best sellers based on sales alone regardless of genre or intended audience, has listed Diary of a Wimpy Kid in its top 150, peaking at number 8, for 141 weeks as of April 4, 2010.

As of the same date, Rodrick Rules has been on the list for 117 weeks (peaking at number 4), The Last Straw has been on the list for 65 weeks (peaking at number 1), Dog Days has been on the list for all 25 weeks of its publication (peaking at number 1), and The Wimpy Kid Movie Diary has been listed for all three weeks of its publication, peaking at number 2.

The series has sold over 200 million books  in 56 languages and 65 editions throughout the world. The series has also generated over $500 million in revenue.

Media

Films 
 
Jeff Kinney announced that a film based on the first book would be produced by 20th Century Fox. The film was released on March 19, 2010, moved up from an April 2 release date. It was directed by Thor Freudenthal, who also directed Hotel for Dogs. The film starred Zachary Gordon as Greg, Robert Capron as Rowley (Greg's best friend), Steve Zahn as Frank (Greg's father), Rachael Harris as Susan (Greg's mother), Devon Bostick as Rodrick (Greg's older brother), Connor and Owen Fielding as Manny (Greg's younger brother), Chloë Grace Moretz as a new character named Angie, and Grayson Russell as Fregley.

There is a second film in the Diary of a Wimpy Kid film series that was released on March 25, 2011, which was based on the second book Rodrick Rules, with Zachary Gordon returning as Greg Heffley. Diary of a Wimpy Kid: Rodrick Rules was also filmed in Vancouver, BC, Canada. The film also contains some scenes from The Last Straw.

The third film combines the third and fourth books The Last Straw and Dog Days, taking stories from both, but mainly from Dog Days, from which it took its title. The decision to blend the two films was made to keep up with the ages of the actors. The film was released on August 3, 2012.

The likelihood of a fourth live-action film was slim. Kinney has announced the possibility for an animated film to be based on Diary of a Wimpy Kid: Cabin Fever as the next installment. In an interview for the book Hard Luck, Jeff Kinney stated he was working with Fox on a half-hour special of Cabin Fever, which was to be aired in late 2014, but as of 2021 no updates on the special have been announced. In September 2016, Jeff Kinney announced officially the production of a fourth film, Diary of a Wimpy Kid: The Long Haul, on his Twitter account. The film was released in May 2017 and was based on The Long Haul, Hard Luck, and The Third Wheel. On August 6, 2019, Disney announced they would reboot Diary of a Wimpy Kid, Home Alone and Night at the Museum for their streaming service, Disney+.

On December 10, 2020, Disney announced at their 2020 Investor's Day that an animated Diary of a Wimpy Kid film would be coming to Disney+ on December 3, 2021.

Musical
A musical titled Diary of a Wimpy Kid: The Musical was produced by the Children's Theatre Company in 2016.

References

External links
Official website
Online book on FunBrain
Official blog
Official film site

Book series introduced in 2007
 
Series of children's books
Abrams Books books